Madala may refer to:

Places
Madala, Andhra Pradesh, a village in Andhra Pradesh, India
Madala Ooru, a village in Karnataka, India
Madala, Estonia, a village in Võru County, Estonia

History
Madala Panji, a chronicle of the Jagannath Temple, Puri, Odisha, India

People
Madala Kunene (born 1951), South African musician
Madala Masuku (born 1965), South African government official
Madala Ranga Rao (1948–2018), Indian film actor and producer
Madala Ravi (active from 1981), Indian actor and film producer
Tholie Madala (1937–2010), South African judge

See also